Do Ladke Dono Kadke is a 1979 Bollywood drama film directed by Basu Chatterjee.The film produced and music composed by Hemant Kumar

Plot
Two petty thieves decide to rob a house that kidnappers had decided to kidnap a child from, what results is chaos, as the child ends up with the petty thieves, and both the thieves & the kidnappers claiming the ransom; and assorted characters showing up to claim the reward offered by the child's parents.

Cast
 Navin Nischol ...Lekhraj Malhotra
 Amol Palekar ...Hari
 Moushumi Chatterjee ...Rani
 G. Asrani ...Ramu
 Keshto Mukherjee ...Shantu's husband / local drunk
 Iftekhar ...Inspector Shinde
 Ranjeet ...Ustad
   Master Ravi...vinnie 
 Prema Narayan ...Champa
 Dina Pathak ...Shantu (Ramu & Rani's mom)
  Kartar Singh...Sikh man in the bus at the beginning the movie 
 Nilu Phule ...Champa's husband
 Mithu Mukherjee ...Maya Malhotra (Guest appearance)
Viju Khote...

Soundtrack

The music of the film was composed by Hemant Kumar and written by Yogesh.

"Chanda Ki Doli Mein" - Asha Bhosle, K. J. Yesudas
"Kise Khabar Kahan Dagar Jeevan Ki Le Jaaye" - K. J. Yesudas

References

External links
 

1979 films
1970s Hindi-language films
1979 drama films
Films directed by Basu Chatterjee
Films scored by Hemant Kumar
Indian drama films